Belt wrestling was contested at the 2017 Asian Indoor and Martial Arts Games in Ashgabat, Turkmenistan from 19 September to 20 September 2017. The competition took place at Ashgabat Main Indoor Arena.

Medalists

Men's freestyle

Men's classic style

Women's freestyle

Women's classic style

Medal table

Results

Men's freestyle

55 kg
19 September

60 kg
19 September

65 kg
19 September

70 kg
19 September

80 kg
19 September

90 kg
19 September

100 kg
19 September

+100 kg
19 September

 Rejepaly Orazalyýew of Turkmenistan originally finished fifth, but was disqualified after he tested positive for Oxandrolone.

Men's classic style

55 kg
20 September

60 kg
20 September

65 kg
20 September

70 kg
20 September

80 kg
20 September

90 kg
20 September

100 kg
20 September

+100 kg
20 September

Women's freestyle

50 kg
19 September

55 kg
19 September

60 kg
19 September

65 kg
19 September

 Dinara Hallyýewa of Turkmenistan originally won the gold medal, but was disqualified after she tested positive for Meldonium.
 Gülnar Haýytbaýewa of Turkmenistan originally won the silver medal, but was disqualified after she tested positive for Methylhexaneamine and 1,3-Dimethylbutylamine.

70 kg
19 September

 Nasiba Surkiýewa of Turkmenistan originally won the gold medal, but was disqualified after she tested positive for Methylhexaneamine and 1,3-Dimethylbutylamine.

+70 kg
19 September

Women's classic style

50 kg
20 September

55 kg
20 September

60 kg
20 September

65 kg
20 September

 Gülnar Haýytbaýewa of Turkmenistan originally won the gold medal, but was disqualified after she tested positive for Methylhexaneamine and 1,3-Dimethylbutylamine.
 Dinara Hallyýewa of Turkmenistan originally won the bronze medal, but was disqualified after she tested positive for Meldonium.

70 kg
20 September

 Nasiba Surkiýewa of Turkmenistan originally won the gold medal, but was disqualified after she tested positive for Methylhexaneamine and 1,3-Dimethylbutylamine.

+70 kg
20 September

References 

 Medalists by events

External links
 Official website

2017 Asian Indoor and Martial Arts Games events
Asian Indoor and Martial Arts Games
2017 Belt wrestling